Galera is a municipality in the comarca of Huéscar, province of Granada, autonomous community of Andalusia, Spain, roughly  from the provincial capital, Granada.

Demographics 
The population of the municipality is distributed among the districts in the following manner (2008):

History
Two significant archeological excavations have taken place in the vicinity of Galera. One has uncovered the Bronze Age Argaric culture, at "El Castellón Alto" or "Castellón de Arriba", where archeologists have excavated many tombs in several artificial terraces on a hill of vertical walls.

The other excavation involves the Iberian Necropolis of Tútugi (in the Cerro del Real) which has several types of tombs. The most numerous of those types consists of a rectangular chamber, covered by a circular tumulus and reached through a long passage. Various objects have been found in these tombs, such as ornaments, Phoenician, Ancient Greek and Iberian vases, weapons, and such funerary goods as alabaster clay figures. These have been dated between the 6th and 3rd centuries BCE.

The "Lady of Galera" or "Goddess of Galera" (see image at left) was found in the 5th century BCE tomb number 20, zone 1 of the Necropolis. It is a Phoenician figurine from the 7th century BCE (similar to another found in Carthage, North Africa), made of alabaster, and probably represents the goddess Astarte. The "lady" or "goddess" is seated between two sphinxes and has an opening through which liquid can be poured into it, which will emerge from small holes corresponding to the nipples of the breasts. The robust forms of the figure suggest Mesopotamian influences; the stylization of the clothing and hair suggest Egyptian influences. It is believed that this sacred object was passed down for many generations before being used as part of a burial.

The city maintained its importance in the Roman era as "TVTVGI", but fell somewhat in population during the Visigothic period and the era of Muslim-ruled Al-Andalus.

In 1230 by Rodrigo Jiménez de Rada, archbishop of Toledo, conquered Galera; it was recovered in 1319 by Ismail I of Granada, and conquered definitively by Castile in 1488, during the reign of the Catholic Monarchs Isabella and Ferdinand. The people of Galera participated in the Morisco Revolt of 1568. In Galera, the revolt was personally suppressed by Don John of Austria, who made a house-by-house assault of the city and salted the fields to make it impossible to grow crops. All the 2500 inhabitants were slaughtered in what is known as the Galera Massacre In the 16th century, Galera was repopulated by families coming principally from Valencia, Murcia, and La Mancha.

Notes

External links
 Ayuntamiento de Galera, official page

Municipalities in the Province of Granada